Eublemma inconspicua is a species of moth of the  family Erebidae. It is known from Australia.

References

Boletobiinae
Moths described in 1865